Café con aroma de mujer (English title: The Scent of Passion) is a Colombian telenovela produced by RCN Televisión and distributed by Telemundo. It first aired on Canal RCN from 10 May 2021 to 24 September 2021. In the United States, it aired on Telemundo from 25 May 2021 to 27 September 2021. It is a new adaptation of the 1994 Colombian telenovela of the same name written by Fernando Gaitán, of which two adaptations were made for Mexico with the titles of Cuando Seas Mía and Destilando amor. The shows stars William Levy, Laura Londoño, and Carmen Villalobos.

Plot 
Every year, Gaviota (Laura Londoño) and her mother arrive at Hacienda Casablanca to pick up the coffee from the second harvest of the year, but they hope that their next visit will be their last, because from now on they will be owners of their own land. However, fate has other plans. Octavio Vallejo, the owner of the hacienda, has just died. Gaviota previously had saved him from a kidnapping. Octavio promised as a reward to give her one hectare of land so that she could grow her own coffee. Trying to get the Vallejo family to honor the agreement, Gaviota meets Sebastián (William Levy), Octavio's son, and an irrepressible attraction is born between them, a heartbreaking, impossible love, becoming two lovers who belong to different worlds.

Cast

Main 
 William Levy as Sebastián Vallejo
 Laura Londoño as Teresa Suárez "La Gaviota"
 Carmen Villalobos as Lucía Sanclemente
 Diego Cadavid as Iván Vallejo
 Lincoln Palomeque as Leonidas Salinas
 Luces Velásquez as Julia de Vallejo
 Katherine Vélez as Carmenza Suárez
 Andrés Toro as Aurelio Díaz
 Mabel Moreno as Lucrecia Valencia de Castillo
 Ramiro Meneses as Carlos Mario
 María Teresa Barreto as Marcela Vallejo
 Laura Archbold as Paula Vallejo
 Juan David Agudelo as Bernardo Vallejo
 Laura Junco as Margarita Briceño
 Dailyn Valdivieso as La Maracucha
 Caterin Escobar as Marcia

Recurring 
 Marcelo Dos Santos as Eduardo Sanclemente
 Yarlo Ruíz as Lemarcus Acosta
 Raúl Ocampo as Carlos
 Pedro Gilmore as Arthur
 Mario Duarte as Pablo Emilio
 Constanza Gutierrez as Margot
 Maia Landaburu as Diana
 Carlos Manuel Vesga as Danilo
 Waldo Urrego as Pedro Alzate
 María del Rosario as Aura
 Jorge López as Javier
 Juan Carlos Cruz as Wilson Briceño
 Julian Santamaría
 Julian Andrés Velásquez
 Juan Sebastián Ruíz

Guest stars 
 Luis Eduardo Motoa as Octavio Vallejo

Production 
Production began in December 2020, in Colombia. The cast list was announced on 4 December 2020 by the American magazine People en Español. A trailer of the series was released on 5 April 2021.

Soundtrack 

The soundtrack of the telenovela was released on 12 July 2021.

Two additional soundtracks for the telenovela were released on 2 August 2021.

Episodes

Reception

Ratings 
  
}}

Awards and nominations

References

External links 
 

2021 telenovelas
RCN Televisión telenovelas
Colombian telenovelas
Spanish-language telenovelas
2021 Colombian television series debuts
2021 Colombian television series endings